Pak Jae-gyong (born 10 June 1933) is a North Korean politician and soldier. A general in the Korean People's Army (KPA), Pak is a Vice Minister in the Ministry of People's Armed Forces as well as a full member of the Central Committee of the Workers' Party of Korea (WPK). Pak is also a delegate of the 12th Supreme People's Assembly (SPA). He is one of the two survivors of 31 commandos sent to assassinate South Korean president Park Chung-hee in the Blue House raid in 1968.

Early life and education
Pak was born in North Hamgyong Province while Korea was under Japanese rule and attended the Kim Il-Sung Political and Military College.

Blue House raid
Pak was one of thirty-one men handpicked for the 1968 Blue House raid (also known as the January 21 Incident in South Korea), an assassination attempt on the life of South Korean President Park Chung-hee. Pak was one of only two survivors of the failed mission, the other being Kim Shin-jo, and was the only one to return to the North.

Military and political career
In February 1985, he assumed the role of brigadier general of the Korean People's Army (KPA), and was made Head of the Propaganda Department of the General Political Bureau of the Korean People's Army. In 1989, Pak took on the role of political commissar of the 4th Corps of the KPA, and in January 1993 was promoted to major general. Through the December by-elections of the same year, Pak was elected as an official of the Central Committee of the Workers' Party of Korea (WPK).

In June 1994, Pak was promoted to the rank of lieutenant general. In September of the same year, he was appointed General Director of the Propaganda Department under the General Political Bureau. In August 1995 he was re-elected as an member of the Central Committee of the WPK. Pak was promoted to general of the KPA in February 1997.

In September 2000, Pak Jae-gyong accompanied Kim Yong-sun, the then vice-chairman of the Committee for the Peaceful Reunification of the Fatherland, on his trip to South Korea at the invitation of then president Kim Dae-jung. Pak presented three tons of the famous Chilbo Mountain pine mushrooms as a present from Kim Jong-il.

In 2007, Pak delivered another gift of pine mushrooms, this time weighing four tons, when he called on President Roh Moo-hyun. It is speculated that the choice of Pak was in part due to his involvement in the Blue House raid, and that sending him was a way of mocking the South.

From 2007 onwards, Pak has been a Vice Minister in the Ministry of People's Armed Forces and in September 2010 was appointed a member of the Central Committee of the WPK.

Pak served as a delegate of the 10th and 11th Supreme People's Assembly (SPA) and since April 2009 has been a delegate of the 12th SPA.	

Over the years, Pak has been a member of the State Funeral Committee for the deaths of Kim Il-sung, O Jin-u, Yon Hyong-muk, Pak Song-chol, Jo Myong-rok and Kim Jong-il.

Awards and honors 
A picture of Pak shows Pak wearing the ribbons to all decorations awarded to him.

See also

Comparative military ranks of Korea
Politics of North Korea

References

1933 births
Living people
People from North Hamgyong
Government ministers of North Korea
North Korean generals
Members of the Supreme People's Assembly
Workers' Party of Korea politicians